Antinational may mean:

 Opposed to nationalism
 Not patriotic
 A person who is against their own nation
 Anti-national (India), a pejorative label and political catchphrase in Indian politics